Pomacea vexillum is a South American species of freshwater snail with gills and an operculum, an aquatic gastropod mollusc in the family Ampullariidae, the apple snails.

Taxonomic note
P. vexillum is considered a synonym of P. puncticulata by some authors.

Distribution
P. vexillum is known from Venezuela and Guyana.

References

External links
 

vexillum
Molluscs of South America
Invertebrates of Venezuela
Freshwater snails
Gastropods described in 1856